Mbonambi may refer to
uMfolozi Local Municipality (formerly Mbonambi) in South Africa
Kwambonambi, a town in South Africa
Bongi Mbonambi (born 1991), South African rugby union footballer